Liolaemus chaltin is a species of lizard in the family  Liolaemidae. It is native to Argentina and Bolivia.

References

chaltin
Reptiles described in 2004
Reptiles of Argentina
Reptiles of Bolivia
Taxa named by Fernando Lobo